Polydiallyldimethylammonium chloride (shortened polyDADMAC or polyDDA), also commonly polyquaternium-6, is a homopolymer of diallyldimethylammonium chloride (DADMAC). The molecular weight of polyDADMAC is typically in the range of hundreds of thousands of grams per mole, and even up to a million for some products. PolyDADMAC is usually delivered as a liquid concentrate having a solids level in the range of 10 to 50%. It is a high charge density cationic polymer. The charge density makes it well suited for flocculation.

History
PolyDADMAC polymers were first prepared and studied in 1957 by Professor George Butler at the University of Florida. It was remarkable as it was soluble in water in contrast at the time to other known synthetic polymers formed by polymerization of monomers containing more than one vinyl functionality. The structure and reaction path was determined in 2002 with NMR studies.

Synthesis
The monomer DADMAC is formed by reacting two equivalents of allyl chloride with dimethylamine.
PolyDADMAC is then synthesized by radical polymerization of DADMAC with an organic peroxide used as a catalyst. Two polymeric structures are possible when polymerizing DADMAC: N-substituted piperidine structure or N-substituted pyrrolidine structure. The pyrrolidine structure is favored.

Applications

Effluent treatment
PolyDADMAC is used in waste water treatment as a primary organic coagulant which neutralizes negatively charged colloidal material and reduces sludge volume compared with inorganic coagulants.

Pulp and paper industry
PolyDADMAC is used for controlling disturbing substances in the papermaking process. It provides superior fixing of pitch from mechanical pulp and of latex from coated broke. Used in the short circulation of a paper mill to enhance retention and dewatering. In addition, it can be used to improve the efficiency of disk filters and flotators, and for cationization of fillers to provide maximal filler retention.

Water purification
PolyDADMAC is used as a coagulant in water purification. It is effective in coagulating and flocculating inorganic and organic particles such as silt, clay, algae, bacteria and viruses.  At high concentrations the organic polymer can remove natural organic matter such as humic and fulvic acids resulting in fewer disinfection byproduct precursors and less color.

References

Organic polymers
Quaternary ammonium compounds
Water treatment